Koillis-Savo is a newspaper that is published by Savon Media Oy. It is established in 1963.

Koillis Savo is published every Thursday in Kaavi and Tuusniemi in North Savo, also in Juankoski and Riistavesi areas. Circulation was 4,891 in 2017.

References

External links
 Official site

1963 establishments in Finland
Finnish-language newspapers
Weekly newspapers published in Finland
Kaavi